The 1969 NCAA Men's Soccer Tournament was the eleventh organized men's college soccer tournament by the National Collegiate Athletic Association, to determine the top college soccer team in the United States.

Saint Louis won a seventh national title, defeating San Francisco in the championship game, 4–0. The final match was played on December 8, 1969, in San Jose, California.

Bracket

Final – Spartan Stadium, San Jose, California

See also 
 1969 NAIA Soccer Championship

References 

Championship
NCAA Division I Men's Soccer Tournament seasons
NCAA
NCAA University Division Soccer Tournament
NCAA University Division Soccer Tournament